"Slow" is a song by British female singer-songwriter Rumer. It is the first single released from her debut album Seasons of My Soul; it reached number 16 on the UK Singles Chart and number 33 on the Irish Singles Chart. The song was record of the week on BBC Radio 2 and Smooth FM. A music video was made for the song and was added to YouTube on 28 July 2010. The video was shot in a recording studio.

Track listings

Chart performance
"Slow" debuted on the UK Singles Chart at number 16 on 15 September 2010, in its second week it dropped to number 31 and dropped out of the Top 40 in its third week. The single also peaked at number 33 on the Irish Singles Chart and number three on the Japan Hot 100.

Weekly charts

Year-end charts

Release history

References

2010 singles
Rumer (musician) songs
2010 songs
Songs written by Rumer (musician)